Liu Jieyi (born December 1957) is a Chinese diplomat and politician. From March 2018 to December 2022, he was director of the Taiwan Affairs Office. From 2013 to September 2017, he was China's Permanent Representative to the United Nations (UN) in New York City.

Biography 
Liu was born in Beijing. He attended Beijing Foreign Studies University and from 1981 to 1987 worked as a translator at the UN offices in Geneva. In 1987, he joined the Ministry of Foreign Affairs of the People's Republic of China, where he worked in various positions until 2009.

From 2009 to 2013, Liu was the Vice Minister of the International Department of the Central Committee of the Communist Party of China.

In 2013, Liu succeeded Li Baodong as China's Permanent Representative to the UN in Manhattan. Liu acted as President of the UN Security Council four times - in November 2013, February 2015, April 2016 and July 2017.

Starting October 2017 and up to March 2018, Liu served as Deputy Director of the Taiwan Affairs Office. He was promoted to Director in March 2018, replacing Zhang Zhijun.

Personal life 
Liu is married to diplomat Zhang Qiyue. The couple has a son.

See also
 Chinese in New York City

References

External links 

 "Biography of Ambassador Liu", China-un.org.

1957 births
Chinese Communist Party politicians from Beijing
Living people
People's Republic of China translators
Permanent Representatives of the People's Republic of China to the United Nations
Beijing Foreign Studies University alumni
20th-century Chinese translators
21st-century Chinese translators
People's Republic of China politicians from Beijing
Writers from Beijing
Members of the 19th Central Committee of the Chinese Communist Party